Sermiligaaq (old spelling: Sermiligâk´) is a settlement in the Sermersooq municipality in southeastern Greenland. It is located near the Sermilik Fjord. Its population was 209 in 2020. In Kalaallisut, its name means "Beautiful Glacierfjord".

Geography 
The small island of Quujuutilik (also spelled Kujutilik or Qûjûtilik) is located off the coast northeast of Sermiligaaq.

Transport 
The settlement is served by the Sermiligaaq Heliport.

Population 
The population of Sermiligaaq has slowly increased in the last two decades, unlike in the neighboring settlements of Kuummiit and Kulusuk.

References

External links 
 eastgreenland.com Tourist information.

Populated places in Greenland